Donken is an unincorporated community in Houghton County, Michigan, United States.

History 
The Case Lumber Company mill and general store were the first businesses in Donken, which the community was settled around. Earl J. Case, owner of the businesses, became the town's first postmaster on April 7, 1919. Donken was a station on the Copper Range Railroad.

References

Unincorporated communities in Houghton County, Michigan
Unincorporated communities in Michigan
Houghton micropolitan area, Michigan